La Cambre Abbey or Ter Kameren Abbey is a former Cistercian abbey in the City of Brussels, Belgium. It is located in the Maelbeek valley between the Bois de la Cambre/Ter Kamerenbos and the Ixelles Ponds. The abbey church is a Catholic parish of the Archdiocese of Mechelen–Brussels and home to a community of Norbertine canons, while other parts of the monastery house the headquarters of the Belgian National Geographic Institute and La Cambre, a prestigious visual arts school.

The abbey was founded around 1196. It was suppressed during the French Revolution. Most of today's buildings date from the 18th century; only the church, the refectory and the wing of the capitular hall maintain their medieval character. The simple abbey church houses Albert Bouts' early 16th-century oil painting The Mocking of Christ.

History

Early history
The abbey was founded around 1196 by its , with the support of the monastic community of Villers Abbey (in present-day Walloon Brabant), following the Cistercian rule. Henry I, Duke of Brabant, donated the Ixelles Ponds, a water mill, and the domain of the monastery. The  ("Abbey of the Chamber of Our Lady"), hence  in short form, remained under the spiritual guidance of Villers, one of the most important Cistercian communities.

Saint Boniface of Brussels (1182–1260), a native of Ixelles, canon of Saint Gudula (future cathedral of Brussels), who taught theology at the University of Paris and was made bishop of Lausanne, Switzerland, in 1231, lived for eighteen years in the abbey and is interred in the church. The mystic leper Saint Alix lived in the community at the same epoch.

During the numerous wars of religion of the 16th and 17th centuries, the abbey was largely destroyed, but it was rebuilt in the 18th century in the French form it largely retains. 
It was suppressed during the French Revolution and sold as national property in 1796.

20th century–present
After the abbey closed as a monastic community, the buildings were used successively as a military hospital, a cotton manufacture, a poor house, and a military school. During the First World War, the premises were occupied by German troops. In 1921, the League of Friends of La Cambre moved into the abbey to preserve it. The terraced garden and formal clipped bosquets were restored in the 18th-century manner starting in 1924.

La Cambre Abbey has been designated a historic site since 30 June 1953.

Architecture and landscape
On the Ixelles Ponds' side, La Cambre Abbey has two entrances. The cloister adjoins the Church of Our Lady of the Cambre and the refectory. The abbey church shows the transition between the primitive Gothic and the Flamboyant Gothic styles. Its northern part dates from the 15th century, whilst its southern part has retained its original roof and two windows from the early 14th century.

The 18th-century abbesses' residence, with its cour d'honneur (main courtyard) in the neoclassical style and French formal gardens, has preserved the presbytery, the stables, and other dependencies.

Residents

Commendatory Abbesses
 Régine, Lady of Beauffort
 Marie, Lady of Egmont
 Catherine de t'Serclaes
 
 Marie, Countess vander Noot
 1627–1709: , elected on 6 March 1683, daughter of Anthonie II Schetz, Count of Grobbendonk
 1757–1794: , last abbess, named Dame Séraphine

Bernardine Nuns
Most of the residing nuns were daughters of important Noble Houses and the abbesses were usually members of wealthy families. The sisters were named Bernardines of La Cambre.
 Saint Alice of Schaerbeek (1204–1250)
 Constantia Rubens, daughter of Peter Paul Rubens
 Catherine d'Ittre

References

Notes

Christian monasteries in Brussels
La Cambre Abbey
Protected heritage sites in Brussels
Christian monasteries established in the 12th century
Cistercian monasteries in Belgium
Monasteries destroyed during the French Revolution